Meadow Lake was a federal electoral district in Saskatchewan, Canada, that was represented in the House of Commons of Canada from 1948 to 1979. It was created in 1947 from The Battlefords ridings, and was abolished in 1976 when it was redistributed into Prince Albert and The Battlefords—Meadow Lake ridings.

Members of Parliament 

This riding elected the following Members of Parliament:

John H. Harrison, Liberal (1949–1958)
Bert Cadieu, Progressive Conservative (1958–1972)
Eli Nesdoly, New Democratic Party (1972–1974)
Bert Cadieu, Progressive Conservative (1974–1979)

Election results

See also 

 List of Canadian federal electoral districts
 Past Canadian electoral districts

External links 
 

Former federal electoral districts of Saskatchewan